Bediha Gün (born 26 October 1994) is a Turkish freestyle wrestler  competing in the 55 kg division. She is a member of Ankara Aski Sport Club. She is a student at Kırkpınar Physical Education and Sports College of Trakya University.

Wrestling career 
Gün lost her chance for a medal in the quarterfinals of the 55 kg event at the  2013 World Wrestling Championships in Budapest, Hungary.

She competed in the 55 kg division at the 2015 European Games held in Baku, Azerbaijan without succeeding to advance from the quarterfinals.

She won the bronze medal at the 2016 European Wrestling Under-23 Championships in Ruse, Bulgaria. She was not able to advance from the Round of 16 in the 2016 European Wrestling Championships in Riga, Latvia.

Gün earned a quota spot at the 2016 Summer Olympics for her second-place performance at the Olympic Qualification Tournament 2 held in Istanbul, Turkey.

In March 2021, she competed at the European Qualification Tournament in Budapest, Hungary hoping to qualify for the 2020 Summer Olympics in Tokyo, Japan. In 2022, she competed in the women's 57 kg event at the Yasar Dogu Tournament held in Istanbul, Turkey. She won one of the bronze medals in the 55 kg event at the European Wrestling Championships held in Budapest, Hungary. A few months later, she won the gold medal in the 57 kg event at the 2022 Mediterranean Games held in Oran, Algeria. She competed in the 57kg event at the 2022 World Wrestling Championships held in Belgrade, Serbia.

References

External links
 

Living people
1994 births
Sportspeople from İzmir
Trakya University alumni
Turkish female sport wrestlers
Wrestlers at the 2015 European Games
European Games competitors for Turkey
Wrestlers at the 2016 Summer Olympics
Olympic wrestlers of Turkey
Competitors at the 2018 Mediterranean Games
Competitors at the 2022 Mediterranean Games
Mediterranean Games gold medalists for Turkey
Mediterranean Games medalists in wrestling
Wrestlers at the 2019 European Games
European Wrestling Championships medalists
Islamic Solidarity Games medalists in wrestling
Islamic Solidarity Games competitors for Turkey
21st-century Turkish sportswomen